Princeton station is an Amtrak intercity train station at 107 Bicentennial Drive in Princeton, Illinois. The station was built in 1911 by the Chicago, Burlington and Quincy Railroad and is listed as "Princeton City" on the Amtrak website and the List of Amtrak stations. Amtrak, the Illinois Department of Transportation and the city worked together to renovate the depot in 1998. Over the following six years, a new roof and gutters were installed, brickwork was repaired and the restrooms were upgraded.

The station is adjacent to Darius Miller Park, which was named in honor of Darius Miller, president of the Chicago, Burlington and Quincy Railroad (CB&Q) from 1910 to 1914; officials from the CB&Q donated the land for the park following Miller's death.

References

External links

Amtrak Depot – City of Princeton
Princeton Amtrak Station – USA Rail Guide (TrainWeb)

Amtrak stations in Illinois
Former Chicago, Burlington and Quincy Railroad stations
Railway stations in the United States opened in 1911
Transportation buildings and structures in Bureau County, Illinois
1911 establishments in Illinois